The North Star Grassman and the Ravens is a 1971 album by English folk rock singer-songwriter Sandy Denny. Built mostly around her own compositions, The North Star Grassman and the Ravens is distinguished by its elusive lyrics and unexpected harmonies.

Chronology
Denny became a solo artist when her previous group Fotheringay dissolved. Half way through recording the group's second album, producer Joe Boyd left to take up a job with Warner Bros. in California, leaving the album unfinished. (The album was eventually released in 2008 as Fotheringay 2.) Denny then launched the sequence of solo albums that underlie the claim that she is one of Britain's finest recent singer-songwriters.

Production
Two original compositions from the Fotheringay 2 sessions, "Late November", inspired by a dream and the death of Fairport Convention band member Martin Lamble, and "John the Gun" were re-worked for the album and supplemented by a further six self penned songs and two cover versions, Bob Dylan's "Down in the Flood" and "Let's Jump the Broomstick", recorded by Brenda Lee. Sessions began with Andy Johns producing but in the end the album was produced by Denny herself, former Fairport Convention bandmate Richard Thompson and John Wood, who recommended to Denny the film-score arranger Harry Robinson, who added strings to "Next Time Around", a cryptogram about former boyfriend Jackson C. Frank (one of her many portraits in song) and "Wretched Wilbur". Robinson would arrange strings for Denny's further albums as well as for Nick Drake and other artists signed to the same company.

The first songs recorded were the traditional "Blackwaterside" and "Let's Jump the Broomstick" in March 1971 at Sound Techniques. Sessions continued the following month until the end of May at Island studios, where the album was completed with the cutting of the title track, a sea voyage as a metaphor for death inspired by the loss of her friend 'Tigger' (Paul Bamber) who was in the Merchant Navy.

A number of other songs were attempted and discarded during the course of the sessions including "Honky Tonk Women", "Walking the Floor Over You" and the traditional "Lord Bateman".

The album was issued in a gatefold sleeve with a distinctive cover photograph of Denny weighing seeds in an old fashioned apothecary shop. The image covered both the front and rear sleeve, and was taken by Keef (Macmillan) who went on to do a lot of work with another British female singer-songwriter: Kate Bush.  A two-disc Deluxe Edition was released by Island Records in 2011. It features the original album plus outtakes and demos, including a previously unreleased instrumental version of Lord Bateman.

The band for the supporting tour consisted of Denny, Thompson (guitar), Gerry Conway (drums), and Dave Richards (bass).

Track listing

2011 deluxe edition re-release

Personnel
 Sandy Denny - lead vocals, acoustic guitar (2/3/11), piano (1)
 Jerry Donahue - electric guitar (1)
 Richard Thompson - electric guitar (1-5/7-9), accordion (2), vocals (4), acoustic guitar (6-7/9-10), bass (7/11)
 Trevor Lucas - acoustic guitar (1/5/8)
 Buddy Emmons - pedal steel guitar (11)
 Pat Donaldson - bass (1-3/8-10)
 Tony Reeves - bass (4/6)
 Gerry Conway - drums (1-4/6-7/9-11)
 Roger Powell - drums (8)
 Ian Whiteman - piano (4-8/10-11), flute organ (10)
 Barry Dransfield - violin (5)
 Royston Wood, Robin Dransfield - backing vocals (5)
 Harry Robinson - string arrangements (6/9)

References 

Sandy Denny: The North Star Grassman and the Ravens

Sandy Denny albums
Island Records albums
1971 debut albums
Albums produced by John Wood (record producer)